Jonathan Graeme Stead (born 7 April 1983) is an English retired professional footballer who played as a striker. He currently is an assistant coach for the Tampa Bay Rowdies in USL Championship, the American second division.

Stead played for Huddersfield Town, Blackburn Rovers, Sunderland, Derby County, Sheffield United, Ipswich Town, Coventry City, Bristol City, Oldham Athletic, Bradford City, Notts County and Harrogate Town, and was also an England under-21 international, earning 11 caps and scoring once.

Club career

Huddersfield Town
Stead began his career with home town club Huddersfield Town where he came through the club's academy. He made his league debut for Huddersfield Town, as a nineteen-year-old against Brentford on 10 August 2002 coming as a 69th-minute substitute in the 2–0 loss on the opening day of the season. In total Stead made 42 league appearances scoring six goals in the 2002–03 season.

He scored four goals in three games at the start of the 2003–04 season, igniting interest from larger clubs. Two goals came in Town's opening game of the 2003–04 season in their 2–2 draw at home to Cambridge United. Stead went on to score two goals in a game on three further occasions for the Terriers during the first part of the 2003–04 season, with his other braces coming against Northampton Town on 13 September in a 3–0 home win, in a dramatic 3–3 away draw at Mansfield Town on 22 November and then again in a 3–1 home win over Doncaster Rovers on 3 January 2004.

He scored 18 goals for Huddersfield in 2003–04, with 16 of them coming in the league, before moving to Premier League side Blackburn Rovers in the January transfer window. His last game for Huddersfield came in their 2–0 win over Boston United on 17 January 2004.

Stead returned to collect his Play-offs Winners' Medal with Huddersfield Town while he was playing for Blackburn Rovers. He appeared on the pitch celebrating the team he supported as a boy and his hometown club's win. After this he said, "I've moved on, but I know I won't find a friendlier place than this club".

Blackburn Rovers
In February 2004 he moved to Blackburn Rovers for over £1 million and signed a four-and-a-half-year contract. Stead marked his debut by scoring the only goal in a match against Middlesbrough. He went on to score six goals, including vital winners against Fulham, Manchester United and Everton as Blackburn avoided relegation from the Premiership.

However, the goals for Blackburn dried up the following season and with manager Mark Hughes signing additional forwards including Welsh international Craig Bellamy, Stead was transferred on 13 June 2005 to Sunderland in a deal worth £1.8 million.

Sunderland
During his time at Sunderland Stead scored two goals, the first of which was on 1 April 2006 against Everton at Goodison Park in a 2–2 draw, breaking his duck of 11 months without a goal. He scored his second Sunderland goal in the 3–1 defeat to Southend United at Roots Hall on 19 August 2006.

On 13 October 2006, he completed a loan move to Derby County and after failing to find the back of the net in his first 6 games, he finally broke his Derby duck with the first goal in a 2–1 win away at Coventry City on 11 November. He followed that goal with the opener in a 2–0 win at Luton Town to make it two in eight appearances and then again went on to bag Derby's first in the 1–0 home win against Leicester City. He was nominated for Powerade Player of the Month as a result of his form at Derby in November.

Sheffield United
Stead was signed by Sheffield United from Sunderland for a fee of £750,000, potentially rising to £1.2 million, on a three-and-a-half-year deal on 11 January 2007.

On 13 January 2007, Stead played his first Premier League game with Sheffield United against Portsmouth and scored his first goal for the Blades a few weeks later, in his third game, against Fulham. He would go on to score again for the Blades in the next match against his former club Blackburn Rovers where Stead's muted celebration further endeared him to the Rovers fans, who remained grateful for the considerable contribution he had made during the relegation scrap in 2004.

He scored a respectable five goals in total that season, the final of which came on the last day of the season against Wigan Athletic on 12 May, but his goal wasn't enough to prevent United from being relegated.

Stead found first team starts harder to come by the following season as he fell behind James Beattie and Billy Sharp in the pecking order but still managed to make over thirty appearances and score six goals. During the subsequent transfer window Stead signed on loan for Championship rivals Ipswich Town with a view to a permanent move.

Ipswich Town
Stead made his move to Ipswich permanent on 15 September 2008 after playing just one game on loan for a fee believed to be around £600,000. In that loan game he scored a 20-yard goal, which he described as "the best goal of his career to date". On 25 April 2009, Stead was the last ever senior player to score at Ninian Park after a 3–0 win.

On 15 February 2010, Stead joined Coventry City on loan until the end of the season with a view to a permanent move. He made 10 appearances for the Sky Blues scoring twice before returning to Ipswich at the end of the season. He has scored in every year of his career to date, notching at least 2 goals for each of the clubs he has played for.

Stead was linked with a move to Blackpool in 2010.

Bristol City
Stead joined Bristol City on a three-year contract on 22 August 2010. He made his debut in the 2–0 loss at previous club Ipswich Town. Stead scored his first goal for Bristol City when he netted in a 3–1 defeat against Portsmouth on 28 September 2010.

On 8 May 2013, Stead was released by City, in hopes of making a move up north to involve his kids spending time with their grandparents.

Return to Huddersfield Town
On 24 June 2013, Stead agreed a return to home town club Huddersfield Town on a two-year deal becoming the team's first signing ahead of the 2013–14 season. He made his 2nd début for the club as a substitute in the 2–1 win over Bradford City in the Football League Cup on 6 August, followed by his league début on 24 August in the 5–1 win over AFC Bournemouth. He scored his first goal for the club in the 3–2 win over local rivals Leeds United on 26 October 2013.

Oldham Athletic (loan)
On 31 January 2014, Stead joined Oldham Athletic on an initial one-month loan.

Bradford City (loan)
On 27 March 2014, Stead joined League One side Bradford City on loan until the end of the 2013–14 season. He made his debut two days later in a 1–0 win away to Leyton Orient. Although he returned to Huddersfield at the end of the season, he rejoined Bradford City on loan on 17 October 2014. He scored four goals in fifteen games in his second loan spell, and briefly returned to Huddersfield in January before Bradford took him on loan for the rest of the 2014–15 season on 8 January. On 24 January 2015 Stead scored one goal and set up a further two in a much deserved 4–2 win away at Chelsea in the FA Cup. In the next round of the FA Cup, Stead scored again; this time in a 2–0 win over his old club Sunderland.

Notts County
On 2 July 2015 Stead signed for Notts County.
He signed a new contract with Notts County at the end of the 2017–18 season.

He was released by Notts County at the end of the 2018–19 season.

Harrogate Town
On 11 June 2019, Stead joined Harrogate Town of the National League. He made his debut for Harrogate in a 2–2 draw with Solihull Moors on 3 August. On 7 September, Stead scored a brace in a 2–4 defeat to Torquay United, in a match in which he was later sent-off. He helped Harrogate win promotion from the National League through the play-offs during his first season at the club, beating his former club Notts County in the final.

On 8 May 2021 - after the final game of the 2020–21 League Two season - Stead announced, on his Twitter account, that he was retiring from professional football having made a total of 704 first-team appearances scoring 165 goals.

Coaching career
Stead joined Harry Watling's staff at Hartford Athletic in the USL Championship as an assistant coach in June 2021.

In January 2022, Stead moved to an assistant coaching role with the Tampa Bay Rowdies. In Florida, he reunites with former Sunderland teammate and current Rowdies manager Neill Collins.

International career
Stead has represented England at international level, as his early goalscoring exploits at Blackburn Rovers led to a call-up for the England Under-21 side for their game against the Netherlands in February 2004. However, he managed just 1 goal in 11 appearances for the Under-21s between 2004–2005.

Personal life
Born in Huddersfield, Stead was raised in Honley and attended Honley High School. Stead and his wife Elizabeth have two daughters.

Career statistics

Honours
Harrogate Town
National League play-offs: 2020
FA Trophy: 2019–20

Individual
Bristol City Player of the Year: 2011–12
EFL League Two Player of the Month: September 2016

References

External links
 Jon Stead player profile at sufc.co.uk
 

1983 births
Living people
Footballers from Huddersfield
English footballers
England under-21 international footballers
Association football forwards
Association football wingers
Huddersfield Town A.F.C. players
Blackburn Rovers F.C. players
Sunderland A.F.C. players
Derby County F.C. players
Sheffield United F.C. players
Ipswich Town F.C. players
Coventry City F.C. players
Bristol City F.C. players
Oldham Athletic A.F.C. players
Bradford City A.F.C. players
Notts County F.C. players
Harrogate Town A.F.C. players
English Football League players
Premier League players
National League (English football) players
English expatriate sportspeople in the United States
Hartford Athletic coaches
Tampa Bay Rowdies coaches
USL Championship coaches